Alexander Grant (1853–1935) was a Massachusetts machinist and politician who served in the Massachusetts House of Representatives and as the sixth mayor of Chicopee, Massachusetts.

Personal life
Grant was born in Lawrence, Massachusetts on September 26, 1853.  Grant was educated in the Lowell, Massachusetts public schools. In 1879 in Chicopee, he married Annie M. Vanzandt (1854–1934), original from Rome, New York. His wife preceded him in death by a few months.

Business career
Grant went to work in the cotton mills of Lowell while he was still young, and aside from two and a half years working in a Lowell machine shop, he spent his business career in the cotton business. In March 1878 Grant moved to Chicopee where he went to work for the Dwight Manufacturing Company.

Political career
Grant was elected to represent Ward 2 on the Chicopee Board of Aldermen, and in 1895 he was elected to represent the Fifth Hampden District in the Massachusetts House of Representatives.

Notes

1853 births
1935 deaths
Mayors of Chicopee, Massachusetts
Republican Party members of the Massachusetts House of Representatives
Politicians from Lawrence, Massachusetts